Evgeny Dubrovin (born January 27, 1986) is a Russian professional ice hockey defenceman who currently plays for HC Ryazan of the Supreme Hockey League (VHL).

Dubrovin previously played in the Russian Superleague for Avangard Omsk and in its successor Kontinental Hockey League for HC Sibir Novosibirsk and Avtomobilist Yekaterinburg.

References

External links

1986 births
Living people
Avangard Omsk players
Avtomobilist Yekaterinburg players
HC Donbass players
HC Kuban players
Russian ice hockey defencemen
HC Ryazan players
Saryarka Karagandy players
HC Sibir Novosibirsk players
Sportspeople from Omsk
Sputnik Nizhny Tagil players
Tsen Tou Jilin City players
Yertis Pavlodar players